"I Love You Because" is a song written and recorded by country music singer and songwriter Leon Payne in 1949. The song has been covered by several artists throughout the years, including hit cover versions by Al Martino in 1963 and Jim Reeves in 1964.

Leon Payne version
In 1949, Leon Payne's original version of the song went to number four on the Billboard Country & Western Best Seller lists and spent two weeks at number one on the Country & Western Disk Jockey List, spending a total of thirty-two weeks on the chart.  "I Love You Because" was Payne's only song to make the country charts.

Elvis Presley version

"I Love You Because" was first recorded by Elvis Presley on July 4 and 5, 1954, at SUN Studio. The session started on the 4th and ended early on the morning of the 5th of July in Memphis, Tennessee, the same day he recorded "That's All Right". Producer Sam Phillips did not think "I Love You Because" was the right song for Elvis's first single, but it was instead used as the B-side of "Tryin' to Get to You", both of which can be found on his 1956 debut album Elvis Presley.

Johnny Cash version 

The song was also notably covered by Johnny Cash. His version was released by Sun Records as a single (Sun 334, with "Straight A's in Love" on the opposite side) in December 1959, when Cash had already left the label for Columbia.

Charts

Al Martino version

In 1963, Al Martino recorded the most successful version of the song, which peaked at number three on the US Billboard Hot 100 chart and number one on the Middle-Road (Adult Contemporary) chart for two weeks in May that year.

Jim Reeves version
In 1963, American country singer Jim Reeves recorded a version of the song for his album Gentleman Jim.  Released as a single in 1964, the song peaked at number five in the UK. The song became his most successful single in Norway, topping the VG-Lista chart for 13 weeks. In 1976, the song was the title track of a posthumous Jim Reeves album, which peaked at number 24 on the US Country LP chart. The 45 release reached number 54 in the US Billboard Country singles chart that year.

Charts

Other versions
In 1950, Ernest Tubb and Clyde Moody each recorded their own version, both making the Top 10 on the Country & Western charts. 
A version by Johnny Cash from his album Sings Hank Williams reached number 20 in 1960.
Carl Smith recorded a cover for his album, I Love You Because (1969). The song peaked at number 14 on the US Billboard Hot Country Songs chart in 1969.
In 1983, Roger Whittaker's version peaked at number 91 on the Hot Country Singles chart.

See also
List of number-one adult contemporary singles of 1963 (U.S.)

References

1949 songs
1963 singles
Al Martino songs
Johnny Cash songs
Carl Smith (musician) songs
Jim Reeves songs
Songs written by Leon Payne
Ernest Tubb songs
Clyde Moody songs
Leon Payne songs
Elvis Presley songs
Capitol Records singles
Sun Records singles